The Burrowa News and Marengo, Binalong, Murrumburrah and Cootamundra Reporter (also published as the Burrowa News) was a weekly English language newspaper published in Boorowa, New South Wales, Australia.

History
First published 1873 by George Eason, the Burrowa News and Marengo, Binalong, Murrumburrah and Cootamundra Reporter was published until 26 January 1951. The paper was continued by the Boorowa News.

Digitisation
The paper has been digitised as part of the Australian Newspapers Digitisation Program  project of the National Library of Australia in cooperation with the State Library of New South Wales.

See also
 List of newspapers in Australia
 List of newspapers in New South Wales

References

External links
 

Publications disestablished in 1951
Publications established in 1873
1873 establishments in Australia
1951 disestablishments in Australia
Defunct newspapers published in New South Wales
Newspapers on Trove